Sorcha Cusack (born 9 April 1949) is an Irish television and stage actress. Her numerous television credits include playing the title role in Jane Eyre (1973), Casualty (1994–1997), Coronation Street (2008) and Father Brown (2013–2022).

Early and personal life
Cusack was born on 9 April 1949 in Dublin, Ireland. She is the second daughter of the actors Cyril Cusack (1910–1993) and Maureen Cusack (1920–1977), her elder sister is actress Sinéad Cusack, and her younger sister is actress Niamh Cusack.  She is a half-sister to Catherine Cusack. Through her sister Sinéad, she is the sister-in-law of actor Jeremy Irons and the aunt of actor Max Irons and his brother, former child actor Samuel Irons.  She is married to actor Nigel Cooke with whom she has two children.

Career
Cusack has made many film and television appearances including Inspector Morse  (“Cherubim and Seraphim“, S6:E5, 1992) as Joyce, The Bill, Casualty (as Staff Nurse / Ward Sister Kate Wilson from 1994 to 1997), a BBC adaptation of  Jane Eyre (1973), and the film Snatch (2000) as the traveller mother of Mickey, played by Brad Pitt. In 1993 she appeared in Poirot “Jewel Robbery at the Grand Metropolitan”. In 1998, she voiced Mother Duck on the cartoon The First Snow of Winter in UK Version. She has also acted for radio, including a guest appearance in the BBC Radio 4 series Baldi and starring as Juno Boyle in the 2014 BBC Radio 3 production of Juno and the Paycock. She played Helen Connor in Coronation Street in 2008, but because of her other acting commitments the role was played by Dearbhla Molloy when the character returned in July 2009.

In 2011, Cusack played Prof. Joanna Pinnock in “Wild Justice”, S5:E2 of Lewis. In the same year she portrayed Hillary Nicholson in two episodes of the first series of Mrs. Brown's Boys. Susie Blake took over the role for the second and third series. Despite this, she did play the part of Justice Dickie in the 2014 film Mrs. Brown's Boys D'Movie. She was part of the main cast of the BBC adaptation of Father Brown from seasons 1 to 9.  She played Mrs. McCarthy, the housekeeper and parish secretary. Cusack played Bridie Stevenson in the BBC television series River (2015).

Cusack has had an extensive career on stage including seasons at the Dublin in Dublin where she made her theatrical debut, the Abbey Theatre, Dublin, the Royal Shakespeare Company, the Royal Exchange, Manchester and The National Theatre in London.   Her West End appearances include Maggie in Dancing at Lughnasa and Monica Murray in By the Bog of Cats with Holly Hunter. On Broadway she played Nora Clitheroie in Sean O'Casey's The Plough and the Stars and Lily Doherty in Brian Friel's The Freedom of the City at the Lincoln Centre in 2000.

Selected theatre performances
 Varya in The Cherry Orchard by Anton Chekhov. Directed by Casper Wrede at the Royal Exchange, Manchester (1980)
 Vassillissa in The Lower Depths by Maxim Gorky. Directed by Braham Murray at the Royal Exchange, Manchester (1980)
 Julia in The Duchess of Malfi. Directed by Adrian Noble at the Royal Exchange, Manchester (1980)
 Mary Mcleod in Detective Story by Sidney Kingsley. Directed by John Dillon at the Royal Exchange, Manchester (1982)
 Mary Barfoot in The Odd Women by Michael Meyer. World premiere directed by Braham Murray at the Royal Exchange, Manchester (1992)
 Wilse in Smoke by Rod Wooden. World premiere directed by Braham Murray at the Royal Exchange, Manchester (1993)
 Major Barbara by George Bernard Shaw. Directed by Greg Hersov at the Royal Exchange, Manchester (2004)

References

External links
 

1949 births
Living people
20th-century Irish actresses
21st-century Irish actresses
Actresses from Dublin (city)
Sorcha
Irish expatriates in England
Irish film actresses
Irish television actresses
People from Dalkey